Ignatius White was an Irish advisor of Limerick origins to James II of England, who sent him to The Hague in 1687 as an envoy extraordinary.  His father, Dominick White, was Mayor of Limerick in 1636.  Both the father and son (and their descendants) were granted the titles Marquess of Albyville (or Albeville) and Count of Alby, as well as greatly augmented arms and other privileges, in 1679 by Leopold I, Holy Roman Emperor.

Family

White, one of six brothers, was born in Ireland about 1626. He was the son of Sir Dominick White, Mayor of Limerick in 1636, and Christina, daughter of Thomas, 4th Baron Bourke of Castleconnell.

By his wife, Mary Warron, he was the father of daughters:

Anna White, who married Don Julián de O'Kallaghan.
Catherine White, who married Antoine de Sartine, Knight of the Order of Saint Michael.  Their son, Antoine de Sartine, Comte d'Alby, was Secretary of State for the Navy under Louis XVI of France.
Winifred White, who married Antonio Álvarez de Bohorques, Marqués de Ruchena.
Mary White, who married Timon Connock, Brigadier and sub-governor for the Infante D. Phelipe.
Theresa White, who married William (Guillermo) Lacy, Knight of the Order of Santiago, Marshal de Camp for the King of Spain and Inspector of Irish Infantry.

Activities

White and some of his brothers (notably his brother Richard, alias Don Ricardo White) were acting as spies for various European governments by the mid-1650s and raising troops for the Spanish army. Ignatius White also performed some diplomatic services for the British government. In 1679 he and his father were created Count of Alby and Marquis or Markgraf of Albeville or Albyville by Emperor Leopold I, for themselves and their descendants.  The titles of Count and Marquis were added to titles in the Holy Roman Empire inherited from their direct ancestor, another Dominick White, who was knighted upon the field of battle by Maximilian I and created a Baron (Freiherr) of the Holy Roman Empire in 1513.

Upon James II's accession to the British throne, Ignatius White of Albeville became a royal advisor and in 1687 went to The Hague as envoy extraordinary. After the Glorious Revolution, Albeville followed James into exile at Saint-Germain-en-Laye.

He died in St Germain on 21 August 1694, and was buried three months later (15 December 1694) at St Margaret's, Westminster, London.

Titles

Hereditary Knight. Holy Roman Empire, 1513
Baron (Freiherr) of Alby, Holy Roman Empire, 1513
Baron de Vique, Netherlands, date uncertain
Baronet, England
Count of Alby, Holy Roman Empire. 1679
Marquis of Albeville or Albyville. Holy Roman Empire, 1679

References 
E.S. De Beer, "The Marquis of Albeville and his brothers," English Historical Review, vol. XLV, no. 179 (July 1930), pp. 397–408
Hungarian National Archives: MOL A 35 - Magyar Kancelláriai Levéltár - Conceptus expeditionum - 1681 - No. 123 (memorandum from the chancellery in Vienna of the 1679 grants)
Testimonio literal de una Certificación expedida por el Cronista D. Ramón Zazo y Ortega sobre el abolengo y ascendencia de la Sra. Da. Maria Fernanda Connock y Whit a requerimiento del Sr. Marqués de Matallana ante D. Francisco Valverde Rodriguez, Notario del Ilustre Colegio de Cáceres con residencia en Jerez de los Caballeros, en 30 de Junio de 1893 (Notarial Document, Archivo Histórico Provincial de Badajoz, Spain)
College of Arms, London: Ms. I.26/101 (Earl Marshal's Book, memorial in Latin of the Grants to Ignatius White by Leopold I)
College of Arms, London: Ms. I.26/100 (Earl Marshal's Book, Royal Licence of Charles II to Ignatius White to accept foreign titles, in Latin)

External links 
 The Albeville MSS (at Indiana University) 
 "The Marquis of Albeville and his Brothers" by E.S. DeBeer 

English politicians
Counts of the Holy Roman Empire
1626 births
1694 deaths
Burials at St Margaret's, Westminster